Boyfriends and Girlfriends (also known as My Girlfriend's Boyfriend) is a 1987 French romantic comedy-drama film written and directed by Éric Rohmer. The film stars Emmanuelle Chaulet, Sophie Renoir, Anne-Laure Meury, François-Éric Gendron and Éric Viellard. It is the sixth and final instalment in Rohmer's Comedies and Proverbs series. The title literally means the (male) friend of my (female) friend, or perhaps the boyfriend of my girlfriend: it echoes the proverb "Les amis de mes amis sont mes amis" ("My friend's friend is my friend").

Plot
Blanche is freshly installed in Cergy-Pontoise, a trendy new town near Paris. She has a new apartment, a new job with no one over and no one under her. She meets Léa at lunch one day, and soon she meets an acquaintance of Léa, Alexandre, whom she approaches somewhat awkwardly. The film then follows the time-honored plot of exchange of relationships, as Blanche and Léa switch boyfriends.

Cast
 Emmanuelle Chaulet as Blanche
 Sophie Renoir as Léa
 François-Éric Gendron as Alexandre
  as Fabien
  as Adrienne

Reception
The film received generally positive reviews from major critics. On Rotten Tomatoes it has an approval rating of 100% based on reviews from 10 critics.

Vincent Canby of The New York Times praised the film highly, saying, "L'Ami de Mon Amie is as clean and functional in appearance as the satellite city, but it's full of unexpected delights." Roger Ebert of the Chicago Sun-Times gave it three out of four and wrote: "Rohmer knows exactly what he is doing here. He has no great purpose, but an interesting small one: He wants to observe the everyday behavior of a new class of French person, the young professionals." Film critic Jonathan Rosenbaum also gave the film a favourable rating. Hal Hinson of The Washington Post wrote: "It's an utterly superficial movie – a celebration of superficiality – and utterly charming."

References

External links
 
 
 

1980s French films
1980s French-language films
1980s romantic comedy-drama films
1987 comedy-drama films
1987 films
1987 romantic comedy films
1987 romantic drama films
Fictional couples
Films about friendship
Films directed by Éric Rohmer
Films produced by Margaret Ménégoz
Films set in France
French romantic comedy-drama films